The Australia national cricket team toured England from May to September 1912, and took part in the 1912 Triangular Tournament, playing three Test matches each against the England national cricket team and the South Africa national cricket team. The tournament was won by England. Australia were captained by Syd Gregory.

Test series summary

Ceylon
The Australians had a stopover in Colombo en route to England and on 4 April played a one-day single-innings match there against the Ceylon national team, which at that time did not have Test status.

References

External links

1912 in Australian cricket
1912 in English cricket
1912 in South African cricket
1912 in Ceylon
1912
1912
International cricket competitions from 1888–89 to 1918
Sri Lankan cricket seasons from 1880–81 to 1971–72